Mytoi (pronounced MY-toy) is a small Japanese garden set within an open pine forest on Chappaquiddick Island, in Martha's Vineyard, Massachusetts.  The Trustees of Reservations owns and maintains the property.

The garden's signature feature is a small pond with an island that is reached by walking over an arched footbridge. Winding footpaths take visitors through birch groves, a dell of camellia and a rock garden.  A rustic shelter offers broad views of the garden and a chance to become immersed in the meditative qualities of the landscape. 

Across Dike Road from the garden, a quarter-mile (400 m) nature trail winds through pitch pine forest to Cape Poge Wildlife Refuge and the salt marshes of Poucha Pond. The Wasque Reservation is nearby.

The Trustees of Reservations acquired the property in 1976 as a gift from the late Mrs. Mary Wakeman and extended it in 1981.  In 1991, Hurricane Bob left the garden a tangle of uprooted trees and shrubs. Mytoi was redesigned and restored with mixed plantings of native and exotic trees and shrubs.

References

External links
Mytoi The Trustees of Reservations
Cape Pogue/Wasque/Mytoi trail map

Asian-American culture in Massachusetts
The Trustees of Reservations
Geography of Martha's Vineyard
Tourist attractions on Chappaquiddick Island
Japanese gardens in the United States
Gardens in Massachusetts
Protected areas established in 1976
1976 establishments in Massachusetts